Chalcocolona is a genus of moths in the family Cosmopterigidae. It contains only one species, Chalcocolona cyananthes, which is found in South Africa and Zimbabwe.

References

Antequerinae
Monotypic moth genera
Moths of Africa